Southam is a town in Warwickshire, England.

Southam or South Ham, may also refer to:

Places
 Southam, Gloucestershire, a village in Gloucestershire, England, UK
 Southam Rural District, a former rural district of Warwickshire, England, UK
 South Ham, a district and ward of Basingstoke, England, UK

Organisations
 Southam Inc., a former Canadian newspaper publisher. Now part of Postmedia News
 Southam United F.C., a football team
 Southam Zoo, a former zoo

People with the surname
Ann Southam (1937–2010), Canadian composer and music teacher
Harry Stevenson Southam (1875–1954), Canadian newspaper publisher
Tom Southam (born 1981), English professional cyclist
William Southam (1843-1932), Canadian newspaper publisher

See also

Baron Banbury of Southam, a peerage title
Ham-Sud, Quebec, Canada

South (disambiguation)
Ham (disambiguation)